Abarsam (Middle Persian: Apursām) was a high-ranking officer in Sasanian Iran, who served as the minister (wuzurg framadar) of king Ardashir I.

References

Sources

Further reading 
  

3rd-century Iranian people
Viziers of the Sasanian Empire
Year of birth unknown
3rd-century births
Year of death unknown